Joseph Henry Ball (1861–1931) was a British architect. Among his commissions was Undershaw in Hindhead, Surrey, built for the family of the writer Arthur Conan Doyle.

Early life
Joseph Henry Ball was born in Alderley Edge, Cheshire, in 1861.

Career
Ball trained as an architect under Alfred Waterhouse. Among his commissions was St Agatha's Church (1895) in Landport, Portsmouth, a grade II listed building.

He also designed Undershaw in Hindhead, Surrey, also grade II listed, for the family of the writer Arthur Conan Doyle.

Death
Ball died in 1931.

References

External links 

1861 births
1931 deaths
Architects from Cheshire
People from Alderley Edge